Kanan Karimov (born 5 August 1976) is an Azerbaijani football manager and former player. He manages Karvan.

Karimov was appointed a manager of the newly reformed Karvan in August 2013.

Career statistics

Managerial statistics

References

External links
 

1976 births
Living people
Association football forwards
Azerbaijani footballers
Azerbaijan international footballers
Gabala FC players